Takeo Yamaguchi (山口長男, Yamaguchi Takeo, born November 23, 1902, in Seoul, Korea, died April 23, 1983, in Tokyo, Japan) was an avant-garde Japanese painter of  monochrome Art Informel works.

About
Yamaguchi studied Western painting at the Tokyo Art School. Upon graduation in 1927, he moved to Paris to study European painting.
He developed his mature style during the mid-1950s, with a focus on flatness.

Yamaguchi's Yellow Eyes, painted in 1959, sold for US$948,500 at Sotheby's Contemporary Art Evening Sale in New York on May 18, 2017, which set a record for the highest price paid for the artist's work.

Exhibitions

Group exhibitions
 1955 - São Paulo Biennial
 1956 - Venice Biennale: Japan Pavilion
 1958 - Guggenheim Museum: Guggenheim International Award exhibition, 
 1963 - São Paulo Biennial
 1964 - Museum of Modern Art, New York: The New Japanese Painting and Sculpture

Solo exhibitions
1961 - Minami Gallery, Tokyo
1963 - Nihonbashi Gallery, New York
1965 - Minami Gallery, Tokyo 
1968 - Minami Gallery, Tokyo 
1972 - Minami Gallery, Tokyo 
1975 - Minami Gallery, Tokyo

Permanent collections
 Guggenheim Museum, New York
 Metropolitan Museum of Modern Art, New York
 Brooklyn Museum, New York
 Menard Art Museum, Nagoya
 Shizuoka Prefectural Museum of Art
 Shimane Art Museum
 Museu de Arte Moderna, São Paulo
 National Museum of Modern Art, Tokyo
 Municipal Museum, Kagoshima
 Museum of Modern Art, Kamakura

References

1902 births
1983 deaths